Detroit Towers is a high-rise residential apartment building located in Detroit, Michigan, on the city's near-east side. The building was constructed in 1922, and stands at 22 floors in height. It is used as an apartment building, and was designed in the neo-gothic architectural style.

Description 
 This is a Detroit landmark highrise along the river, just across from Belle Isle.
 Detroit Towers was added to the National Register of Historic Places in 1985.

External links
 Google Maps location of Detroit Towers
 
 

Apartment buildings in Detroit
Residential skyscrapers in Detroit
Gothic Revival architecture in Michigan